Harry & Meghan: Becoming Royal is a 2019 historical fiction television film about the royal wedding of Prince Harry and Meghan Markle and their first year of marriage. The movie originally aired on the Lifetime Network on May 27, 2019, as a sequel to Harry & Meghan: A Royal Romance.

Cast
Charlie Field as Prince Harry, Duke of Sussex
Tiffany Smith as Meghan, Duchess of Sussex
Jordan Whalen as Prince William, Duke of Cambridge
Bonnie Soper as Diana, Princess of Wales 
Charles Shaughnessy as Charles, Prince of Wales
Deborah Ramsay as Camilla, Duchess of Cornwall
Clare Filipow as Stella
Marlie Collins as Annabella
James Dreyfus as Sir Leonard Briggs

References

External links 

2019 drama films
2019 films
2019 television films
Drama films based on actual events
Lifetime (TV network) films
Cultural depictions of Prince Harry, Duke of Sussex
Cultural depictions of Meghan, Duchess of Sussex
Films scored by Mario Grigorov
Films directed by Menhaj Huda
American drama television films
2010s English-language films
2010s American films